Shulgin is a Russian masculine surname, its feminine counterpart is Shulgina. It may refer to

Alexander Shulgin (1925–2014), American pharmacologist and drug developer
Shulgin Rating Scale
Alexander Shulgin (musician) (born 1964), Russian author and composer
Alexei Shulgin (born 1963), Russian artist
Ann Shulgin (1931–2022), American author and wife of Alexander Shulgin
Anna Shulgina (born 1993), Russian film and stage actress, singer and TV presenter
Arina Shulgina (born 1991), Russian triathlete
Maxim Shulgin (born 1983), Russian volleyball player
Sergei Shulgin (born 1963), Russian football player
Vasily Shulgin (1878–1976), Imperial Russian politician

Russian-language surnames